Adama Samassékou from Mali is the current president, with ministerial rank, of the African Academy of Languages. Born in 1946 in Mali, he served between July 2002 and December 2003 as the President of the PrepCom of the Geneva phase of the World Summit on the Information Society (WSIS). Previously, he was Malian Minister of Education (1993-2000) and former spokesperson for the Government of Mali (1997-2000). Since 2003, he is a member of the Haut Conseil de la Francophonie.

Playing an active role in community life, Mr. Samassékou is the founding President, for Mali and Africa as a whole, of the Peoples' Movement for Human Rights Education, in association with PDHRE, and since 21 October 2005, President of the International Federation of ICVolunteers. In the political sphere, he was the founding Chairman of ADEMA-France.

He was Head of the Linguistic Department of the Institute of Human Sciences of Mali, then Director of the National Library of Mali and Adviser to the Minister in charge of Culture. He is now the President of the MAAYA World Network for Linguistic Diversity.

In 2010 Mr. Samassékou served as one of the commissioners of the Broadband Commission for Digital Development.

He speaks Bamanankan, Songhay, Fulfulde, French, Russian and English.

He makes an appearance in the 2010 documentary film Motherland (2010 film)

References

External links
 salzburgseminar.org short bio

1946 births
Living people
Malian pan-Africanists
Government ministers of Mali
21st-century Malian people